was a town in Satsuma District, Kagoshima Prefecture, Japan.

As of 2003, the town had an estimated population of 4,853 and the density of 62.23 persons per km². The total area was 77.99 km².

On March 22, 2005, Tsuruda, along with the town of Miyanojō (also from Satsuma District), was merged into the expanded town of Satsuma (former name: 薩摩町; current name: さつま町) and no longer exists as an independent municipality.

External links
 Official website of Satsuma 

Dissolved municipalities of Kagoshima Prefecture